In enzymology, a GTP diphosphokinase is an enzyme that catalyzes the chemical reaction

ATP + GTP  AMP + guanosine 3'-diphosphate 5'-triphosphate

Thus, the two substrates of this enzyme are ATP and GTP, whereas its two products are AMP and guanosine 3'-diphosphate 5'-triphosphate.

This enzyme belongs to the family of transferases, specifically those transferring two phosphorus-containing groups (diphosphotransferases).  The systematic name of this enzyme class is ATP:GTP 3'-diphosphotransferase. Other names in common use include stringent factor, guanosine 3',5'-polyphosphate synthase, GTP pyrophosphokinase, ATP-GTP 3'-diphosphotransferase, guanosine 5',3'-polyphosphate synthetase, (p)ppGpp synthetase I, (p)ppGpp synthetase II, guanosine pentaphosphate synthetase, GPSI, and GPSII.  This enzyme participates in purine metabolism.

Structural studies

References

 
 

EC 2.7.6
Enzymes of known structure